In accrual accounting, the matching principle instructs that an expense should be reported in the same period in which the corresponding revenue is earned, and is associated with accrual accounting and the revenue recognition principle states that revenues should be recorded during the period in which they are earned, regardless of when the transfer of cash occurs. By recognizing costs in the period they are incurred, a business can see how much money was spent to generate revenue, reducing "noise" from timing mismatch between when costs are incurred and when revenue is realized. Conversely, cash basis accounting calls for the recognition of an expense when the cash is paid, regardless of when the expense was actually incurred.

If no cause-and-effect relationship exists (e.g., a sale is impossible), costs are recognized as expenses in the accounting period they expired: i.e., when have been used up or consumed (e.g., of spoiled, dated, or substandard goods, or not demanded services). Prepaid expenses are not recognized as expenses, but as assets until one of the qualifying conditions is met resulting in a recognition as expenses. Lastly, if no connection with revenues can be established, costs are recognized immediately as expenses (e.g., general administrative and research and development costs).

Prepaid expenses, such as employee wages or subcontractor fees paid out or promised, are not recognized as expenses; they are considered assets because they will provide probable future benefits. As a prepaid expense is used, an adjusting entry is made to update the value of the asset. In the case of prepaid rent, for instance, the cost of rent for the period would be deducted from the Prepaid Rent account.

Expense vs. cash timing
Two types of balancing accounts exist to avoid fictitious profits and losses that might otherwise occur when cash is paid out not in the same accounting periods as expenses are recognized, because expenses are recognized when obligations are incurred regardless when cash is paid out according to the matching principle in accrual accounting. Cash can be paid out in an earlier or later period than obligations are incurred (when goods or services are received) and related expenses are recognized that results in the following two types of accounts:
 Accrued expense: Expense is recognized before cash is paid out.
 Deferred expense: Expense is recognized after cash is paid out.

Accrued expenses is a liability with an uncertain timing or amount, but where the uncertainty is not significant enough to qualify it as a provision. An example is an obligation to pay for goods or services received from a counterpart, while cash for them is to be paid out in a later accounting period when its amount is deducted from accrued expenses. It shares characteristics with deferred income (or deferred revenue) with the difference that a liability to be covered latter is cash received from a counterpart, while goods or services are to be delivered in a latter period, when such income item is earned, the related revenue item is recognized, and the same amount is deducted from deferred revenues.

Deferred expenses (or prepaid expenses or prepayment) is an asset, such as cash paid out to a counterpart for goods or services to be received in a latter accounting period when fulfilling the promise to pay is actually acknowledged, the related expense item is recognized, and the same amount is deducted from prepayments. It shares characteristics with accrued revenue (or accrued assets) with the difference that an asset to be covered latter are proceeds from a delivery of goods or services, at which such income item is earned and the related revenue item is recognized, while cash for them is to be received in a later period, when its amount is deducted from accrued revenues.

Examples
 Accrued expense allows one to match future costs of products with the proceeds from their sales prior to paying out such costs.
 Deferred expense (prepaid expense) allows one to match costs of products paid out and not received yet.
 Depreciation matches the cost of purchasing fixed assets with revenues generated by them by spreading such costs over their expected useful life span.

Accrued expenses
For example, goods supplied by a vendor in one accounting period, but paying for them in a later period results in an accrued expense that prevents a fictitious increase in the receiving company's value equal to the increase in its inventory (assets) by the cost of the goods received, but unpaid. Without such accrued expense, a sale of such goods in the period they were supplied would cause that the unpaid inventory (recognized as an expense fictitiously incurred) would effectively offset the sale proceeds (revenue) resulting in a fictitious profit in the period of sale, and in a fictitious loss in the latter period of payment, both equal to the cost of goods sold.

Period costs, such as office salaries or selling expenses, are immediately recognized as expenses (and offset against revenues of the accounting period). Unpaid period costs are accrued expenses (liabilities) to avoid such costs (as expenses fictitiously incurred) to offset period revenues that would result in a fictitious profit. An example is a commission earned at the moment of sale (or delivery) by a sales representative who is compensated at the end of the following week, in the next accounting period. The company recognizes the commission as an expense incurred immediately in its current income statement to match the sale proceeds (revenue), so the commission is also added to accrued expenses in the sale period to prevent it from otherwise becoming a fictitious profit, and it is deducted from accrued expenses in the next period to prevent it from otherwise becoming a fictitious loss, when the rep is compensated.

Deferred expenses
A deferred expense (prepaid expense or prepayment) is an asset used to costs paid out and not recognized as expenses according to the matching principle.

For example, when the accounting periods are monthly, an 11/12 portion of an annually paid insurance cost is added to prepaid expenses, which are decreased by 1/12 of the cost in each subsequent period when the same fraction is recognized as an expense, rather than all in the month in which such cost is billed. The not-yet-recognized portion of such costs remains as prepayments (assets) to prevent such cost from turning into a fictitious loss in the monthly period it is billed, and into a fictitious profit in any other monthly period.

Similarly, cash paid out for (the cost of) goods and services not received by the end of the accounting period is added to the prepayments to prevent it from turning into a fictitious loss in the period cash was paid out, and into a fictitious profit in the period of their reception. Such cost is not recognized in the income statement (profit and loss or P&L) as the expense incurred in the period of payment, but in the period of their reception when such costs are recognized as expenses in P&L and deducted from prepayments (assets) on balance sheets.

Depreciation
Depreciation is used to distribute the cost of the asset over its expected life span according to the matching principle. If a machine is bought for $100,000, has a life span of 10 years, and can produce the same amount of goods each year, then $10,000 of the cost (i.e. $100,000/10 years) of the machine is matched to each year, rather than charging $100,000 in the first year and nothing in the next 9 years. This matches costs to sales and therefore gives a more accurate representation of the business, but results in a temporary discrepancy between profit/loss and the cash position of the business.

References

See also
 Accrual
 Comparison of cash and accrual methods of accounting
 Deferrals in accrual accounting
 FIFO and LIFO accounting, different ways of matching stock to sales
 Revenue recognition

Expense
Accounting terminology